OS9, OS-9, or OS 9 may refer to:
 Mac OS 9, an operating system for the Apple Macintosh
 iOS 9, the ninth version of the iOS operating system
 OS-9, a Unix-like real time operating system
 OS/9, an operating system for the UNIVAC
 OS9 (gene), which encodes protein OS-9 in humans